Rémy Amieux (born 5 September 1986) is a French former footballer who plays as a left-back. He formerly played for Dutch clubs NEC, FC Eindhoven, RKC Waalwijk and NAC Breda.

References

External links
 Voetbal International profile 
 

1986 births
Living people
Sportspeople from Vienne, Isère
Association football midfielders
Association football defenders
French footballers
Eredivisie players
Eerste Divisie players
Ligue 2 players
Championnat National players
Championnat National 2 players
Championnat National 3 players
FC Eindhoven players
NEC Nijmegen players
RKC Waalwijk players
NAC Breda players
Red Star F.C. players
Andrézieux-Bouthéon FC players
French expatriate footballers
Expatriate footballers in the Netherlands
French expatriate sportspeople in the Netherlands
Footballers from Auvergne-Rhône-Alpes